Leek soup is a soup based on potatoes, leeks, broth (usually chicken), and heavy cream. Other ingredients used may be salt, pepper, and various spices.

Generally the potatoes are diced and cooked in broth, while the leeks are chopped and sautéed. After this, all ingredients are combined and stirred. Chives may be used for garnish.

Leek soup is traditionally associated with Wales, and is an important item of Welsh cuisine. In Romania, this soup is popular and known as Ciorbă de praz, and in France it is called Soupe aux poireaux. One variant of leek soup is vichyssoise, which is generally served cold.

See also
 List of soups
 List of vegetable soups

References

Vegetable soups
Welsh cuisine
Irish cuisine
Australian soups
New Zealand soups
Leek dishes